Aemilius Macer was a Roman jurist active in the third century AD.

Usually denominated simply "Macer", he was the author of five works on Roman law: De Re Militari, Publica Judicia, De Officio Praesidis, Ad Legem Uicensimam Hereditatum, and De Appellationibus. Sixty-five extracts from Macer's works appear in the Digest.

References

2nd-century Romans
3rd-century Romans
3rd-century writers
Ancient Roman jurists